List of lands may refer to:
 List of continents
 Lists of islands
 List of lost lands
 List of sovereign states